Dr. Wake's Patient is a 1916 British silent romance film directed by Fred Paul and starring Phyllis Dare, Gerald McCarthy and James Lindsay. A doctor, who is a farmer's son, falls in love with one of his patients who comes from a wealthy aristocratic background.

Cast
 Phyllis Dare - Lady Gerania 
 Gerald McCarthy - Dr. Wake 
 James Lindsay - The Earl 
 Mary Rorke - Mrs. Wake 
 Wyndham Guise - Farmer Wake 
 Dora Barton - The Countess

References

External links
 

1916 films
British romantic drama films
British silent feature films
Films directed by Fred Paul
Ideal Film Company films
British black-and-white films
1916 romantic drama films
1910s English-language films
1910s British films
Silent romantic drama films